Troleandomycin (TAO for short) is a macrolide antibiotic. It was sold in Italy (branded Triocetin) and Turkey (branded Tekmisin). It is no longer sold in Italy as of 2018.

The drug's mode of action is to bind to the ribosome, specifically in the tunnel through which the newly formed peptide egresses, thereby halting protein synthesis.
Troleandomycin is a CYP3A4 inhibitor that may cause drug interactions.

References 

CYP3A4 inhibitors
Macrolide antibiotics
Epoxides
Spiro compounds
Acetate esters